"Too Much" is a song by British pop band Bros, released on 17 July 1989. "Too Much" was their first and most successful single from their second album The Time. It reached number one in Ireland and number two on the UK Singles Chart, where it was certified silver. It was Bros' last top-five single in the UK.

Music video
The video was directed by Colin Chilvers, who also directed Michael Jackson's "Smooth Criminal" video, and produced by Nick Verden in the south of France, in and around Nice.

Track listings
UK 7-inch and cassette single
 "Too Much" – 3:33
 "Astrologically" – 3:29

UK 12-inch and CD single
 "Too Much" (extended version) – 6:42
 "Too Much" – 3:33
 "Astrologically" – 3:29

Credits
 Nicky Graham – producer
 Paul Wright – engineer
 Tom Lord-Alge – mix of "Too Much"

Charts

Weekly charts

Year-end charts

Certifications

References

1989 singles
1989 songs
Bros (British band) songs
CBS Records singles
Song recordings produced by Nicky Graham
Songs written by Luke Goss
Songs written by Matt Goss
Songs written by Nicky Graham